MX Rider (often stylized as MXrider) is a racing video game developed by Paradigm Entertainment and published by Infogrames in 2001. It was the first title released under Infogrames' newly reinvented Atari brand name, which Infogrames used alongside their own branding until 2003. MX Rider features over 10 real Grand Prix riders and every track from the 2000 world motocross GP championship. 

An enhanced port of the game without the FIA license, Big Air Freestyle, was released for the GameCube in 2002.

Reception 

The game received "average" reviews according to the review aggregation website Metacritic.

References

External links 

2001 video games
PlayStation 2-only games
Racing video games
Video games developed in the United States
Multiplayer and single-player video games
PlayStation 2 games
Paradigm Entertainment games
Infogrames games